Leveler is the fourth studio album by American metalcore band August Burns Red. It was released on June 21, 2011, through Solid State Records and was produced by Jason Suecof.

Release and promotion
They released the first song, "Empire", on May 16, 2011 on their Facebook page. It was announced on May 14, 2011 that they were shooting a video for "Internal Cannon". They released "Internal Cannon" on May 31, 2011 via Craveonline.com. They released "Divisions", June 4, 2011 on YouTube and promoted it through their Facebook page. "Poor Millionaire", the ninth track from the album, was released June 14, 2011 on their official website.

Commercial performance
Leveler sold around 29,000 copies in the United States in its first week of release to land at position No. 11 on The Billboard 200 chart.

As with their previous album, a special, Christmas seven-inch vinyl single will be released with the album through their old label, CI Records, and will be entitled "God Rest Ye Merry Gentlemen". The vinyl is limited to 1000 copies, 400 that are gold-colored, 400 that are white, and 200 that are mixed white-and-gold. The single was released on November 8, 2011.

10th anniversary edition
For the album's 10th anniversary, the band re-recorded it with guest musicians, alternate tunings, and new guitar solos. The anniversary edition is scheduled to be released May 21, 2021, through the band's own label, ABR Records. On April 21, the same day as the announcement of the 10th anniversary edition, the band released a new version of "Poor Millionaire" featuring guest vocals from Ryan Kirby of Fit for a King. On May 6, they released a new version of "Pangaea", that features a guest guitar solo from Misha Mansoor of Periphery, as the second single from the 10th anniversary edition.

Track listing

Personnel
August Burns Red
 Jake Luhrs – lead vocals
 JB Brubaker – lead guitar
 Brent Rambler – rhythm guitar
 Dustin Davidson – bass, backing vocals, additional guitar, pre-production
 Matt Greiner – drums, piano

Additional musicians
 Jason Suecof – percussion, additional guitar, producer, mixing

Additional personnel
 Troy Glessner – mastering
 Eyal Levi – additional mixing
 Jonathan Dunn and Adam Skatula – A&R
 Jordan Crane – illustrations
 Invisible Creature – art direction
 Ryan Clark – design
 Cory Morton – band photography

References

August Burns Red albums
2011 albums
Solid State Records albums